Pettneu am Arlberg is a municipality in the district of Landeck in the Austrian state of Tyrol. It is located 16.3 km west of the city of Landeck. The location was first mentioned in 1300 as Ponte novu (nou) which means new bridge. The main sources of income are summer and winter tourism and agriculture.

References

External links

Cities and towns in Landeck District
Verwall Alps